The 1954–55 Western Kentucky State Hilltoppers men's basketball team represented Western Kentucky State College (now known as Western Kentucky University) during the 1954-55 NCAA University Division Basketball season. The Hilltoppers were led by future Naismith Memorial Basketball Hall of Fame coach Edgar Diddle. Western won the Ohio Valley Conference season championship but lost in the semifinals of the conference tournament.  Ralph Crosthwaite and Forest Able were named to the All-Conference and OVC Tournament teams.

Schedule

|-
!colspan=6| 1955 Ohio Valley Conference Tournament

|-

References

Western Kentucky Hilltoppers basketball seasons
Western Kentucky State
Western Kentucky State Basketball, Men's
Western Kentucky State Basketball, Men's